Type S4 ship may refer to:

Casablanca-class escort carrier a S4-S2-BB3 ship.
Gilliam-class attack transport a S4-SE2-BD1 ship.
Artemis-class attack cargo ship a S4-SE2-BE1 ship.